Sri Lanka participated at the 2018 Asian Games in Jakarta and Palembang, Indonesia from 18 August to 2 September 2018.

The Sri Lankan team was scheduled to consist of 185 athletes (138 men and 47 women), marking the large contingent the country has sent to a single edition of the Asian Games. The Sri Lankan team will compete in 28 sports, marking its debut in the sports of baseball, canoeing, roller sports and triathlon. Approximately, 60 officials and coaches were also a part of the contingent, making the total team size 245. However, the athletics team was cut to 14 athletes (from 25), making the team size 174 (128 men and 46 women), which would still make this the biggest team the country has sent to the games. Further changes made the final team size at 173 athletes (131 men and 42 women). Sri Lanka will also have an athlete competing in the demonstration event of esports.

On August 17, 2018, weightlifter Dinusha Gomes was announced as the country's flag bearer at the opening ceremony.

The National Shooting Sports Federation of Sri Lanka declined to enter any athletes for the games because the National Olympic Committee of Sri Lanka refused a request for a coach to go with the team.

Sri Lanka failed to win a medal, being jointly ranked with eight other countries for last place. The country's highest placement was two fourth-place finishes for the men's 4 × 400 m track and field relay team and the men's rugby sevens team.

Competitors
The following is the list of number of competitors participating at the Games per sport/discipline.

Archery

Sri Lanka originally had five archers (three men and two women), who met the qualification standards. However, the Sri Lankan Olympic Committee approved only one male archer.

Men

Athletics

Sri Lanka originally entered a team of 25 athletes (18 men and seven women), however the team would only be finalized after the National Championships, held in Colombo from August 3 to 5, 2018. Two athletes were given exceptions to the trials as they were training overseas: Indunil Herath and Hiruni Wijayaratne. The final team consisted of 14 athletes. The team was later reduced to 12 athletes (seven men and five women), after the entries of Ushan Thiwanka and Upamali Ratnakumari were rejected by organizers due to the national organization forgetting to enter their names on time. The track and field team failed to win a medal for the third straight Asian Games. The top placing performance was fourth by the men's 4 × 400 m relay team who finished with a time that was off the Sri Lankan record by 0.03 seconds.

Men
Track & road events

Ruwan was the reserve and did not compete in the heats or final.

Field events

Women
Track & road events

Badminton

Sri Lanka entered six badminton athletes (four men and two women). The team's best performance was a quarterfinals finish by the men's doubles pairs team of Sachin Dias and Buwaneka Goonethilleka.

Singles

Doubles

Baseball

Sri Lanka made its Asian Games debut in the sport of baseball. The team first competed in the a preliminary qualification group to qualify to compete in group A. Sri Lanka's baseball squad consisted of 18 athletes. Sri Lanka won its debut match by beat Laos 15 to 10. However, a loss to Thailand the next day meant the team was eliminated.

 Summary

Roster
Sri Lanka announced their squad on August 6, 2018. The team consists of 18 athletes. The position of the player is listed in parentheses.

Akalanka Ranasinghe (OF)
Sameera Rathnayake (OF)
Saliya Wijesinghe (OF)
Tharindu Madumal (P)
Sanjeewa Jayarathne (P)
Shasika Dulshan (P)
Chirath Karunarathne (P)
Chamika Yasas (P)
Nelanka Karunarathna (C)
Isara Gunasiri (C)
Amila Pushpa Kumara (OF)
Naween Anuradha (P)
Sanjeewa Manna (INF)
Sandun Madushanka (INF)
Krishna Hapuarachchi (INF)
Sahan Avishka (INF)
Iresh Kosala (C)
Kaushala Prabuddha (OF)

Round 1

Basketball

Sri Lanka entered both a men's and women's 3-on-3 teams. Each team consisted of four athletes.

Men's 3-on-3 tournament

Roster
Sinna Fernando
Pawan Gamage
Arnold Thevakumar
Kisal Wijewarnasooriya

Women's 3-on-3 tournament

Roster
Imesha Durage
Fathima Moreseth
Anne Ravindran
Rashmi Don

Beach volleyball

Sri Lanka entered one male beach volleyball pair. The pair won one match and lost two, placing them third in the group. With that result, the pair did not advance out of their group.

Boxing

Sri Lanka's boxing team consisted of six athletes (three men and three women).

Canoeing 

Sri Lanka entered one male kayaker.

Sprint
Men

Qualification Legend: FA=Final A; SF=Semifinals
Results given are within the heat.

Field hockey

Sri Lanka qualified a men's field hockey team after winning the bronze medal at the qualifying tournament in Muscat, Oman. With the win against Hong Kong, the Sri Lankan men's field hockey team won its first game in 40 years at the Asian Games. The win in 1978 also came against Hong Kong. The Sri Lankan team finished in eighth place, after losing the 7th place match to Oman.

Men's tournament

Roster

Pool A

Seventh place match

Summary

Golf

Sri Lanka entered four male golfers. Before the competition began, 20 teams put in complaints to the Court of Arbitration for Sport, disputing the eligibility of three of the golfers: Mithun Perera, Nadaraja Thangarajah and Anura Rohana. The event is open to amateurs, and all three were considered professionals. The Court of Arbitration for Sport ruled against excluding them from the games. However, the team went ahead and still replaced the three golfers.  All three were replaced with Joseph De Soysa, Sachin De Silva, and Kumara Patrick.

Men

Gymnastics

Rhythmic
Sri Lanka entered one rhythmic gymnast.

Individual Qualification

For qualification, the top three of four scores counted towards a gymnast's total.

Individual final

Judo

Sri Lanka entered two male judokas.

Men

Kabaddi

Sri Lanka entered a men's and women's team of 12 athletes each (24 total). The women's team will participate for the first time ever. The president of the Sri Lankan Kabaddi federation, Anura Pathirana, resigned after both teams failed to win a medal.

Summary

Men's tournament

The men's team consisted of 12 athletes.

Roster

Chamara Haputhanthri
Milinda Chathuranga
Sajith Indrakumara
Chaminda Samarakoon
Lahiru Kuruppu
Lahiru Sampath
Dilan Sanjaya
Rathnapala
Asiri Sadaruwan
Aslam Sajah
Pushpakumara
Nishantha Gunawardhana

Pool A

Women's tournament

The women's team consisted of 12 athletes.
Roster

Madhushani Chaturika
Kokila Edirisinghe
Indika Damyanthi
Thilini Kanchana
Madhurika Hansmali
Methusala Thilakshani
Nimesha Dilrukshi
Thilakshi Wijethilaka
Gothami Kaushalya
Sajini Jayasinghe
Indiwari Wejethunga
Sithumini Manojini

Pool A

Karate

Sri Lanka entered six karatekas (four men and two women).

Kata

Kumite

Roller Sports

Sri Lanka entered four athletes in the speed discipline (two men and two women). This marks the first time the country will compete in the sport at the Asian Games.

Speed

Rowing

Sri Lanka entered four rowers. The team finished in last place in all three races in competed in and therefore ranked eighth (and last) in the quadruple sculls.

Men

Qualification Legend: FA=Final A (medal); FB=Final B (non-medal); R=Repechage
Results given are within the heat.

Rugby sevens

Sri Lanka entered a men's team.

Men's tournament

Sri Lanka announced their squad on August 9, 2018. The team consists of 12 athletes.

Sudarshana Muthuthanthri
Danushka Ranjan
Jason Dissanayake
Danush Dayan
Srinath Sooriyabandara
Kavindu Perera
Sudam Sooriyarachchi
Gayan Weeraratne
Tarinda Ratwatte
Buddhima Piyarathane
Reeza Raffaideen
Rehan Silva

Group C

Quarterfinal

Semifinal

Bronze medal match

Sailing

Sri Lanka entered one male sailor in the laser standard event.

Men

Squash

Sri Lanka entered four squash players (four per gender). All four squash players lost their first matches three sets to zero, and did not advance further in the competition.

Singles

Swimming

Sri Lanka's swimming team consisted of five male swimmers. Matthew Abeysinghe broke the national record in the men's 200 m freestyle event. Sri Lankan swimmers advanced to only one final, through Matthew Abeysinghe's sixth-place finish in the 100 metres freestyle event. The sixth-place finish, was the best swimming result for Sri Lanka at the Asian Games.

Men

Table Tennis

Sri Lanka entered two table tennis players (one male and one female).

Taekwondo

Sri Lanka entered six taekwondo practitioners (three per gender).

Tennis

Sri Lanka's tennis team consisted of four athletes (two men and two women).

Singles

Doubles

Triathlon

Sri Lanka entered one male triathlete. This also marked the country's Asian Games debut in the sport.

Individual

Volleyball

Sri Lanka will be returning to the Asian Games for the first time since 1966. The Sri Lankan team finished in 13th place (out of 20 teams) after defeating Vietnam in the 13th place match.

Indoor volleyball

Men's tournament

Roster
Sri Lanka's men's volleyball team consisted of 14 athletes.

Chamara Mihiran
Deepthi Romesh
Gayan Madushanka
Lasindu Wasanthapriya
Janitha Surath
Malith Chamara
Shamil Silva
Ayesh Perera
Wasantha Lakmal
Kasun Fernando
Danushka Fernando
Sehan Sagara
A.W. Lakmal
Pramesh Sudasingha

Pool E

13th–20th quarterfinal

13th–16th semifinal

13th place game

Weightlifting

Sri Lanka entered four weightlifters (two per gender).

Wrestling

Sri Lanka entered one male wrestler.

Men's freestyle

Wushu

Sri Lanka entered two wushu athletes (one man and one woman).

Sanda

Demonstration sport

eSports

Sri Lanka qualified one athlete in e-sports.

See also
Sri Lanka at the 2018 Commonwealth Games
Sri Lanka at the 2018 Summer Youth Olympics
Sri Lanka at the 2018 Asian Para Games

References

Nations at the 2018 Asian Games
Sri Lanka at the Asian Games
2018 in Sri Lankan sport